Los Hermanos Rosario (The Rosario Brothers in English) is a merengue band, originally consisting of brothers Toño Rosario, Pepe, Rafa and Luis.

History 
Los Hermanos Rosario is an emblematic merengue music band from the Dominican Republic. The orchestra was founded on 1 May 1978, Labor Day in Salvaleón de Higuey, a town on the edge of the eastern part of the Dominican Republic. At that time, the 7 brothers debuted with the municipal authorities in a ceremony in their native town. 

Shortly thereafter, Los Hermanos Rosario began a quest in search of artistic success. They developed their activities initially in their native town and in some cities in the east of the country. An important start for the brothers was being hired by a teacher, Chiquitín Payan, to enliven activities at Casa de Campo, a Resort in La Romana, a town in their country.

In 1980 the band recorded their first single "Maria Guayando" which quickly caught the attention of the public. So they decided to move to the capital city Santo Domingo and released their first album thus resulting in great success. This first album contained these hit songs: "Las Locas", "Vengo Acabando", "Bonifacio" y "El Lápiz".

In 1983 the group suffered a tremendous loss when the leader, pianist and musical director, Pepe Rosario, died. This situation forced Los Hermanos Rosario to suspend their activities for a while and even caused the members to think of ending their musical career.

However, the orchestra was able to bounce back from their loss. After the loss of a brother, a mentor, and an outstanding musician, the brothers rose out of the ashes and placed themselves at the top of the artistic scene. In 1987, they launched a new album titled "Acabando" which contained songs that have surpassed the time barrier. These title songs include: "Borrón y Cuenta Nueva", "Adolescente" and "La Luna Coqueta".

A successful career started, and Los Hermanos Rosario continued reaching new heights of popularity. Hits such as "Otra Vez", "Fuera de Serie" and "Insuperables" made the band one of the most listened to musicians in the Dominican Republic. Songs such as "Rubia de Fuego", "Ingrata", "Mi Tonto Amor", "Bomba", "Cumandé", "Loquito Por Ti", "Dime", "Esa Morena", "Bríndame Una Copa", "Desde Que la Ví", "Mil Horas" and "Pecadora" kept the band under the spotlight. The song "Pecadora" was included in the soundtrack of the 1991 film Tacones Lejanos, a Spanish production directed by Pedro Almodóvar.

The group launched another album in 1993 titled "Los Mundialmente Sabrosos". The first single of this album, "Amor, Amor", reached number one on the Tropical music charts in the United States, Puerto Rico, The Dominican Republic, Central America, Venezuela and Colombia. "Amor, Amor" situated Rosario Brothers in Billboard Magazine and with the second single, titled "Morena Ven", they manage to become the first act within the Merengue genre, situating in the top 10 of Billboard Magazine (a position reached so high only by Juan Luís Guerra). That song became an anthem in the Spanish world, consolidating them as the most valued and popular Dominican ensemble abroad. "The Wretched", "Oh, woman", "Slave of your love" and "Good luck" make the list of records which were also hit songs of that work.

In 1995 Los Hermanos Rosario launched the album that would be the most internationally successful of their career to this date, "Los Dueños del Swing" (in English: "The Owners of Swing"). This disc, with excellent speed and quality, with the single "La Dueña del Swing" (in English: "The Mistress of Swing"), placed on top of all the Latinos Hit Parades. This album was honored by Billboard magazine as Tropical Music Album of the year: it became one of the most popular merengue record in the history of this style, with essential reference for all Latin music clubs in the world. Together with "The Owner of Swing", the theme "A day in New York" became quite a musical event, and the same happened with "kleptomaniac", "Video Clip", "Candy", "Hot Women", "oleyl", "Oh, how lonely" and "Woman banned".

After that topping album, the band released their first Billboard charts number-one hit Latin music album "Y Es Facil" (1997), followed by "Bomba 2000" (2000) and "Swing A Domicilio" (2002), which continued an unstoppable way of recording with topics which have been true musical events: "The Rompecintura", "The Weekend", "Feel", "It freed me", "To your recollection" and "I like".

During his career, the group has taken their music all over the Americas and Europe: the Carnegie Hall, Madison Square Garden, Lincoln Center, Radio City Music Hall, the Polyhedron of Venezuela, Latin American Festival of Milan, Rome Festival, London, Madrid, Amsterdam, Brussels, Zurich, Berlin, etc. are just some places and capitals of the world where have performed Los Hermanos Rosario. They have been awarded many times with the popular "Congo de Oro" (Golden Congo) at the Carnival of Barranquilla, in Colombia, and their award of "Super Congo de Oro" (Super Golden Congo), in Puerto Rico, generated a veritable craze with their music, becoming a source of inspiration for many merengue interpreters of neighboring islands, who found in Rosario Brothers an input to develop their careers along the lines of the famous Merengue Bomba genre. The Canary Islands surrendered to their feet, and with Andy Montañez this act has recorded and performed for most people in occasions like Carnivals, with certifications by Guinness Book of Records.

After an inadvertent removal of the recording studio in 2003 for a legal dispute with his former record label Karen Records, which remained without a new record for 5 years, Los Hermanos Rosario came back on track with their new album in 2007 titled "Aura", which was released under the label "J&N Records" and "Sony BMG Music Entertainment".

This album contains 13 tracks, which already began to play in major radio stations across America a song entitled "Alò", a lilting Bachata Merengue merged with authoring and arrangements by Sandy MC, Jorge and Rafael Rosario, and is destined to become another success of Rosario Brothers.

This recording session was entirely made in the Dominican Republic, and for this the Rosary Agency gave the services of the best technicians, composers, musicians and arrangers of their country. With the album "Aura" the band confirmed their qualities and commitments to the merengue genre, blending the typical style with other musical elements and innovative colors in wearing.

Discography

Studio albums 
 1983: Vol. 1
 1984: Vol. 2
 1985: Vol. 3
 1987: Acabando!
 1988: Otra Vez!
 1990: Fuera de Serie
 1991: Insuperables
 1993: Los Mundialmente Sabrosos
 1995: Los Dueños del Swing
 1997: Y Es Fácil!
 1999: Bomba 2000
 2002: Swing a Domicilio
 2007: Aura

Compilations 
 1988: Lo Mejor de los Hermanos Rosario
 1989: Lo Mejor de los Hermanos Rosario Vol. 2
 1993: 14 Éxitos Impresionantes
 1994: Juntos Con Sus Éxitos
 1997: El Disco de Oro
 1998: La Historia Musical Rosario
 2001: 20 Aniversario
 2003: Grandes Éxitos
 2005: Grandes Éxitos Vol. 2
 2006: Antología Musical
 2007: CD Económico de Santo Domingo
 2007: La Bomba
 2010: XXX Los Rosario: 30 Años de Swing

References

External links

Los Hermanos Rosario | Biography

Dominican Republic musical groups
Musical groups established in 1978
Merengue music groups
Sibling musical groups